The Napo River is a tributary to the Amazon River that rises in Ecuador on the flanks of the east Andean volcanoes of Antisana, Sincholagua and Cotopaxi.

Geography

Before it reaches the plains it receives a great number of small streams from impenetrable, saturated and much broken mountainous districts, where the dense and varied vegetation seems to fight for every piece of ground. From the north it is joined by the Coca River, having its sources in the gorges of Cayambe volcano on the equator, and also a powerful river, the Aguarico having its headwaters between Cayambe and the Colombia frontier.
From the west, it receives a secondary tributary, the Curaray, from the Andean slopes, between Cotopaxi and the Tungurahua volcano.  From its Coca branch to the mouth of the Curaray the Napo is full of snags and shelving sandbanks and throws out numerous canoes among jungle-tangled islands, which in the wet season are flooded, giving the river an immense width.  From the Coca to the Amazon it runs through a forested plain where not a hill is visible from the river - its uniformly level banks being only interrupted by swamps and lagoons.
The Coca river may be penetrated as far up as its middle course, where it is jammed between two mountain walls, in a deep canyon, along which it dashes over high falls and numerous reefs. This is the stream made famous by the expedition of Gonzalo Pizarro.

Tributary

Drainge basin

Discharge

References: 

Estudio Binacional de Navegabilidad del Río Napo (Ecuador-Perú)

References:

Boletin extraordinario de la evaluación hidrológica y pluviométrica en la cuenca amazónica peruana (Senamhi, 2012)

References:

Boletin extraordinario de la evaluación hidrológica y pluviométrica en la cuenca amazónica peruana (Senamhi, 2013)

See also 
 Lake Pilchicocha

References

Tributaries of the Amazon River
Rivers of Ecuador
Rivers of Peru
International rivers of South America
Rivers of Loreto Region
Geography of Napo Province
Geography of Orellana Province
Geography of Sucumbíos Province
Upper Amazon